Shunpei or Shumpei (written: , , ,  or ) is a masculine Japanese given name. Notable people with the name include:

, Japanese footballer
, Japanese boxer
, Japanese footballer
, Japanese writer
, Japanese footballer
, Japanese philosopher
, Japanese swimmer
, Japanese inventor

Japanese masculine given names